Bikas Ranjan Mishra is an Indian screenwriter and film director. His first feature film Chauranga released in January 2016. The film won awards at Mumbai Film Festival and Indian Film Festival of Los Angeles (IFFLA).

His short film Dance of Ganesha had its world premiere at the 16th Busan International Film Festival, and its European premiere at the 41st International Film Festival Rotterdam. The film was also shown at Clermont Ferrand Short Film Festival in France. He is a recipient of the Hubert Bals Fund for script development.

He has directed a film adaptation of renowned Bengali playwright Badal Sarkar's Pagla Ghoda which is on Hotstar.

Filmography 
Dance of Ganesha (2011)
Chauranga (2014)
Pagla Ghoda (2017)
Guy in the Sky (2017)

Awards
2011 NFDC Incredible India Award  for Chauranga
2014 Best Film (India Gold) at 16th Mumbai Film Festival 2014 for Chauranga
2015 Grand Jury Prize at Indian Film Festival of Los Angeles

References

External links 
 

Indian film critics
Living people
Hindi-language film directors
Indian male screenwriters
Year of birth missing (living people)